
Hof van Sonoy is a defunct restaurant in Blokzijl, Netherlands. It was a fine dining restaurant that was awarded one Michelin star in 2005 and retained that rating until 2008.

Owner and head chef of Hof van Sonoy was Paul van Staveren.

Restaurant Hof van Sonoy was located in a refurbished 19th century school.

The restaurant lost its star in 2008, when the restaurant was closed. The owner moved the restaurant to Emmeloord and opened the restaurant there as Sonoy.

Hof van Sonoy was a member of Alliance Gastronomique Néerlandaise since 2006.

See also
List of Michelin starred restaurants in the Netherlands
Sonoy

References 

Restaurants in the Netherlands
Michelin Guide starred restaurants in the Netherlands
Defunct restaurants in the Netherlands